Test cricket is the oldest form of cricket played at international level. A Test match is scheduled to take place over a period of five days, and is played by teams representing full member nations of the International Cricket Council (ICC).
 
The following is a list of records by the New Zealand Test cricket team. It is based on the List of Test cricket records, but concentrates solely on records dealing with the New Zealand Test cricket team, and any cricketers who have played for that team.

New Zealand took part in their first recognised Test cricket match against England in the 1929/30 season, and the records listed here date from that time.
 New Zealand won the inaugural ICC World Test Championship, beating India in the final by 8 wickets. They are ranked number two in Tests, number one in ODIs and number four in T20Is.

Key
The top five records are listed for each category, except for the team wins, losses, draws and ties and the partnership records. Tied records for fifth place are also included. Explanations of the general symbols and cricketing terms used in the list are given below. Specific details are provided in each category where appropriate. All records include matches played for New Zealand only, and are correct .

Team records

Overall record

Team wins, losses, draws and ties
, New Zealand have played 464 Test matches resulting in 112 victories, 182 defeats and 170 draws for an overall winning percentage of 24.13.

First Test series wins

First Test match wins

Team scoring records

Most runs in an innings
The highest innings total scored in Test cricket came in the series between Sri Lanka and India in August 1997. Playing in the first Test at R. Premadasa Stadium in Colombo, the hosts posted a first innings total of 6/952d. This broke the longstanding record of 7/903d which England set against Australia in the final Test of the 1938 Ashes series at The Oval. The first Test of the 2018–19 series against the Bangladesh saw New Zealand set their highest innings total of 715/6d.

Highest successful run chases
New Zealand's highest fourth innings total is 451 all out in an unsuccessful run chase against England at Christchurch in March 2002. England had set a target of 549. New Zealand's highest successful run chase occurred against Pakistan at Christchurch in 1994. Pakistan had set New Zealand a target of 324.

Fewest runs in an innings
The lowest innings total scored in Test cricket came in the second Test of England's tour of New Zealand in March 1955. Trailing England by 46, New Zealand was bowled out in their second innings for 26 runs.

Most runs conceded in an innings
The highest innings total scored against New Zealand is by West Indies when they scored 660/5d in the second Test of the West Indies tour of New Zealand in 1995 at Basin Reserve.

Fewest runs conceded in an innings
The lowest innings total scored against New Zealand is 51 in the only test of Zimbabwe's tour of New Zealand in 2012

Result records

A Test match is won when one side has scored more runs than the total runs scored by the opposing side during their two innings. If both sides have completed both their allocated innings and the side that fielded last has the higher aggregate of runs, it is known as a win by runs. This indicates the number of runs that they had scored more than the opposing side. If one side scores more runs in a single innings than the total runs scored by the other side in both their innings, it is known as a win by innings and runs. If the side batting last wins the match, it is known as a win by wickets, indicating the number of wickets that were still to fall.

Greatest win margins (by innings)
The fifth Test of the 1938 Ashes series at The Oval saw England win by an innings and 579 runs, the largest victory by an innings in Test cricket history. The largest victory for New Zealand, which is the 8th largest, is their win against Zimbabwe in the Only Test of the 2011–12 tour at the McLean Park, where the hosts won by an innings and 301 runs.

Greatest win margins (by runs)
The greatest winning margin by runs in Test cricket was England's victory over Australia by 675 runs in the first Test of the 1928–29 Ashes series. The largest victory recorded by New Zealand, which is the 8th largest victory, was recorded against Sri Lanka in the second and final Test of the 2018-19 tour at the Hagley Oval, where the hosts won by 423 runs.

Greatest win margins (by 10 wickets)
New Zealand have won a Test match by a margin of 10 wickets on 5 occasions.

Narrowest win margins (by runs)
New Zealand's narrowest win was by 1 run (the second such victory in Test history, after West Indies), against England in a match in February 2023. England made 435 runs in first innings. In response, New Zealand were dismissed for 209 and were asked to follow-on. In the second innings, New Zealand scored 483 runs to set a target of 257 runs to win for England, which they fell one run short of.

Narrowest win margins (by wickets)
New Zealand's narrowest win by wickets came in the first Test of the West Indies cricket team in New Zealand in 1979-80 in February 1980. Played at the Carisbrook, the hosts won the match by a margin of one wicket, one of only fourteen one-wicket victories in Test cricket.

Greatest loss margins (by innings)
The Oval in London played host the greatest defeat by an innings in Test cricket. The final Test of the 1938 Ashes saw England defeat the tourists by an innings and 579 runs, to the draw the series at one match all. New Zealand's biggest defeat came during the Pakistan tour in 2002 when they lost by an innings and 324 runs at Lahore Stadium, Lahore.

Greatest loss margins (by runs)
The first Test of the 1928–29 Ashes series saw Australia defeated by England by 675 runs, the greatest losing margin by runs in Test cricket. New Zealand's biggest defeat by runs was against South Africa in the first Test of the 2007 tour at New Wanderers Stadium.

Greatest loss margins (by 10 wickets)
New Zealand have lost a Test match by a margin of 10 wickets on 13 occasions with most recent being during the 2nd test of the New Zealand cricket team in the West Indies in 2014.

Narrowest loss margins (by runs)
The narrowest loss of New Zealand in terms of runs is by 30 runs against South Africa in the first test of the New Zealand's tour of South Africa in 1961.

Narrowest loss margins (by wickets)
The narrowest loss of New Zealand in terms of wickets is by 3 wickets against Australia in the third test of New Zealand cricket team in Australia in 2015–16.

Individual records

Batting records

Most career runs
A run is the basic means of scoring in cricket.
India's Sachin Tendulkar has scored the most runs in Test cricket with 15,921. Second is Ricky Ponting of Australia with 13,378 ahead of Jacques Kallis from South Africa in third with 13,289.

Fastest runs getter

Most runs in each batting position

Most runs against each team

Highest individual score
The second test of the Indian cricket team in New Zealand in 2013–14 saw Brendon McCullum score his first and New Zealand's only triple century and record New Zealand's highest Individual score.

Highest individual score – progression of record

Highest individual score against each team

Highest career average
A batsman's batting average is the total number of runs they have scored divided by the number of times they have been dismissed.

Highest Average in each batting position

Most half-centuries
A half-century is a score of between 50 and 99 runs. Statistically, once a batsman's score reaches 100, it is no longer considered a half-century but a century.

Sachin Tendulkar of India has scored the most half-centuries in Test cricket with 68. He is followed by the West Indies' Shivnarine Chanderpaul on 66, India's Rahul Dravid and Allan Border of Australia on 63 and in fifth with 62 fifties to his name, Australia's Ricky Ponting.

Most centuries
A century is a score of 100 or more runs in a single innings.

Tendulkar has also scored the most centuries in Test cricket with 51. South Africa's Jacques Kallis is next on 45 and Ricky Ponting with 41 hundreds is in third.

Most double centuries
A double century is a score of 200 or more runs in a single innings.

Bradman holds the Test record for the most double centuries scored with twelve, one ahead of Sri Lanka's Kumar Sangakkara who finished his career with eleven. In third is Brian Lara of the West Indies with nine. England's Wally Hammond, Mahela Jayawardene of Sri Lanka and Virat Kohli of India scored seven double centuries.

Most triple centuries
A triple century is a score of 300 or more runs in a single innings.

India's Virender Sehwag, Australia's Don Bradman and West Indies's Chris Gayle and Brian Lara have each scored two triple centuries. Brendon McCullum is the only New Zealand Player who has scored a single Test triple century .

Most Sixes

Most Fours

Most runs in a series
The 1930 Ashes series in England saw Don Bradman set the record for the most runs scored in a single series, falling just 26 short of 1,000 runs. He is followed by Wally Hammond with 905 runs scored in the 1928–29 Ashes series. Glenn Turner with 672 in the 1972 tour of West Indies is the highest New Zealander on the list.

Most ducks
A duck refers to a batsman being dismissed without scoring a run. Chris Martin has scored the second-highest number of ducks in Test cricket behind Courtney Walsh.

Bowling records

Most career wickets
A bowler takes the wicket of a batsman when the form of dismissal is bowled, caught, leg before wicket, stumped or hit wicket. If the batsman is dismissed by run out, obstructing the field, handling the ball, hitting the ball twice or timed out the bowler does not receive credit.

Shane Warne held the record for the most Test wickets with 708 until December 2007 when Sri Lankan bowler Muttiah Muralitharan passed Warne's milestone. Muralitharan, who continued to play until 2010, finished with 800 wickets to his name. James Anderson of England is third on the list taking 632 wickets holds the record for most wickets by a fast bowler in Test cricket. New Zealand's Richard Hadlee is the highest ranked New Zealand bowler taking 431 wickets.

Most career wickets against each team

Fastest wicket taker

Best figures in an innings
Bowling figures refers to the number of the wickets a bowler has taken and the number of runs conceded.
There have been three occasions in Test cricket where a bowler has taken all ten wickets in a single innings – Jim Laker of England took 10/53 against Australia in 1956, India's Anil Kumble in 1999 returned figures of 10/74 against Pakistan and New Zealand's Ajaz Patel in 2021, returning figures of 10/119 against India. Richard Hadlee is one of 15 bowlers who have taken nine wickets in a Test match innings.

Best figures in an innings against each team

Best figures in a match
A bowler's bowling figures in a match is the sum of the wickets taken and the runs conceded over both innings.

No bowler in the history of Test cricket has taken all 20 wickets in a match. The closest to do so was English spin bowler Jim Laker. During the fourth Test of the 1956 Ashes series, Laker took 9/37 in the first innings and 10/53 in the second to finish with match figures of 19/90. Richard Hadlee's figures of 15/123 taken during the first match of the New Zealand tour of Australia in 1985, is the 10th best in Test cricket history.

Best career average
A bowler's bowling average is the total number of runs they have conceded divided by the number of wickets they have taken.
Nineteenth century English medium pacer George Lohmann holds the record for the best career average in Test cricket with 10.75. J. J. Ferris, one of fifteen cricketers to have played Test cricket for more than one team, is second behind Lohmann with an overall career average of 12.70 runs per wicket.

Best career economy rate
A bowler's economy rate is the total number of runs they have conceded divided by the number of overs they have bowled.
English bowler William Attewell, who played 10 matches for England between 1884 and 1892, holds the Test record for the best career economy rate with 1.31. New Zealand's Jeremy Coney, with a rate of 2.04 runs per over conceded over his 52-match Test career, is 43rd on the list.

Best career strike rate
A bowler's strike rate is the total number of balls they have bowled divided by the number of wickets they have taken.
As with the career average above, the top bowler with the best Test career strike rate is George Lohmann with strike rate of 34.1 balls per wicket. New Zealand's Shane Bond is at third position in this list.

Most five-wicket hauls in an innings
A five-wicket haul refers to a bowler taking five wickets in a single innings.
Richard Hadlee is third on the list of most five-wicket hauls behind Sri Lanka's Muttiah Muralitharan and Australia's Shane Warne in Test cricket.

Most ten-wicket hauls in a match
A ten-wicket haul refers to a bowler taking ten or more wickets in a match over two innings.
Richard Hadlee is third on the all-time list of the most ten-wicket hauls in Test cricket, having taken the most of any fast bowler with 9 ten-wicket hauls. Only spin bowlers Muralitharan and Warne have taken more with 22 and 10 respectively.

Worst figures in an innings
The worst figures in a single innings in Test cricket came in the third Test between the West Indies at home to Pakistan in 1958. Pakistan's Khan Mohammad returned figures of 0/259 from his 54 overs in the second innings of the match. 
The worst figures by a New Zealander is 0/181 that came off the bowling of Matthew Hart in the second test of the West Indies tour of New Zealand in 1995.

Worst figures in a match
The worst figures in a match in Test cricket were taken by South Africa's Imran Tahir in the second Test against Australia at the Adelaide Oval in November 2012. He returned figures of 0/180 from his 23 overs in the first innings and 0/80 off 14 in the third innings for a total of 0/260 from 37 overs. He claimed the record in his final over when two runs came from it – enough for him to pass the previous record of 0/259, set 54 years prior.

The worst figures by a New Zealander is by Matthew Hart in the second test of the West Indies tour of New Zealand in 1995.

Most wickets in a series
England's seventh Test tour of South Africa in 1913–14 saw the record set for the most wickets taken by a bowler in a Test series. English paceman Sydney Barnes played in four of the five matches and achieved a total of 49 wickets to his name.

Hat-trick
In cricket, a hat-trick occurs when a bowler takes three wickets with consecutive deliveries. The deliveries may be interrupted by an over bowled by another bowler from the other end of the pitch or the other team's innings, but must be three consecutive deliveries by the individual bowler in the same match. Only wickets attributed to the bowler count towards a hat-trick; run outs do not count.
In Test cricket history there have been just 44 hat-tricks, the first achieved by Fred Spofforth for Australia against England in 1879. In 1912, Australian Jimmy Matthews achieved the feat twice in one game against South Africa. The only other players to achieve two hat-tricks are Australia's Hugh Trumble, against England in 1902 and 1904, Pakistan's Wasim Akram, in separate games against Sri Lanka in 1999, and England's Stuart Broad.

Wicket-keeping records
The wicket-keeper is a specialist fielder who stands behind the stumps being guarded by the batsman on strike and is the only member of the fielding side allowed to wear gloves and leg pads.

Most career dismissals
A wicket-keeper can be credited with the dismissal of a batsman in two ways, caught or stumped. A fair catch is taken when the ball is caught fully within the field of play without it bouncing after the ball has touched the striker's bat or glove holding the bat, while a stumping occurs when the wicket-keeper puts down the wicket while the batsman is out of his ground and not attempting a run.
New Zealand's BJ Watling is the highest New Zealander in taking most dismissals in Test cricket as a designated wicket-keeper.

Most career catches
Watling is seventh in taking most catches in Test cricket as a designated wicket-keeper.

Most career stumpings
Bert Oldfield, Australia's fifth-most capped wicket-keeper, holds the record for the most stumpings in Test cricket with 52. New Zealand wicket-keeper Brendon McCullum is equal 43rd on 11.

Most dismissals in an innings
Four wicket-keepers have taken seven dismissals in a single innings in a Test match—Wasim Bari of Pakistan in 1979, Englishman Bob Taylor in 1980, New Zealand's Ian Smith in 1991 and most recently West Indian gloveman Ridley Jacobs against Australia in 2000.

The feat of taking 6 dismissals in an innings has been achieved by 24 wicket-keepers on 32 occasions with Watling being the only New Zealander.

Most dismissals in a match
Three wicket-keepers have made 11 dismissals in a Test match, Englishman Jack Russell in 1995, South African AB de Villiers in 2013 and most recently India's Rishabh Pant against Australia in 2018.

The feat of making 10 dismissals in a match has been achieved by 4 wicket-keepers on 4 occasions.
The most dismissals made by New Zealand wicket-keeper is nine, once by Brendon McCullum in 2009 and twice by BJ Watling in 2014 and 2015.

Most dismissals in a series
Brad Haddin holds the Test cricket record for the most dismissals taken by a wicket-keeper in a series. He took 29 catches during the 2013 Ashes series. New Zealand's record is held by Artie Dick when he made 23 dismissals during the New Zealand cricket team in South Africa in 1961–62.

Fielding records

Most career catches
Caught is one of the nine methods a batsman can be dismissed in cricket.  The majority of catches are caught in the slips, located behind the batsman, next to the wicket-keeper, on the off side of the field. Most slip fielders are top order batsmen.

India's Rahul Dravid holds the record for the most catches in Test cricket by a non-wicket-keeper with 210, followed by Mahela Jayawardene of Sri Lanka on 205 and South African Jacques Kallis with 200. Stephen Fleming is the highest ranked New Zealander in seventh, securing 171 catches in his Test career.

Most catches in a series
The 1920–21 Ashes series, in which Australia whitewashed England 5–0 for the first time, saw the record set for the most catches taken by a non-wicket-keeper in a Test series. Australian all-rounder Jack Gregory took 15 catches in the series as well as 23 wickets. Greg Chappell, a fellow Australian all-rounder, and India's K. L. Rahul are equal second behind Gregory with 14 catches taken during the 1974–75 Ashes series and during the 2018 Indian tour of England respectively. Four players have taken 13 catches in a series on six occasions with both Bob Simpson and Brian Lara having done so twice and Rahul Dravid and Alastair Cook once. Stephen Fleming is the highest ranked New Zealander in this list.

All-round records

1000 runs and 100 wickets
A total of 71 players have achieved the double of 1000 runs and 100 wickets in their Test career.

250 runs and 20 wickets in a series
A total of 18 players on 24 occasions have achieved the double of 250 runs and 20 wickets in a series.

Other records

Most career matches

India's Sachin Tendulkar holds the record for the most Test matches played with 200, with former captains Ricky Ponting and Steve Waugh being joint second with each having represented Australia on 168 occasions. Daniel Vettori and Ross Taylor are the highest ranked New Zealanders in this list.

Most consecutive career matches
Former English captain Alastair Cook holds the record for the most consecutive Test matches played with 159. He broke Allan Border's long standing record of 153 matches in June 2018. The recently retired New Zealand wicket-keeper-batsman Brendon McCullum, who is fifth on the list with 101 matches, is the highest ranked cricketer who never missed a Test match during his playing career.

Most matches as captain

Graeme Smith, who led the South African cricket team from 2003 to 2014, holds the record for the most matches played as captain in Test cricket with 109.Stephen Fleming who led the side for nine years from 1997 to 2006 is third on the list with 80 matches.

Most matches won as a captain

Most man of the match awards

Most man of the series awards

Youngest players on debut
The youngest player to play in a Test match is claimed to be Hasan Raza at the age of 14 years and 227 days. Making his debut for Pakistan against Zimbabwe on 24 October 1996, there is some doubt as to the validity of Raza's age at the time. The youngest New Zealander to play Test cricket was Daniel Vettori who at the age of 18 years and 10 days debuted in the second Test of the series against England in February 1997.

Oldest players on debut
England left-arm slow bowler James Southerton is the oldest player to appear in a Test match. Playing in the very first inaugural test against Australia in 1876 at Melbourne Cricket Ground, in Melbourne, Australia, he was aged 49 years and 119 days. Herb McGirr is the oldest New Zealand Test debutant when he made his debut during the 1930 England series at the Eden Park.

Oldest players
England all-rounder Wilfred Rhodes is the oldest player to appear in a Test match. Playing in the fourth Test against the West Indies in 1930 at Sabina Park, in Kingston, Jamaica, he was aged 52 years and 165 days on the final day's play. The oldest New Zealand Test player is Jack Alabaster who was aged 41 years and 242 days when he represented New Zealand for the final time in the 1972 tour of West Indies at the Queen's Park Oval.

Partnership records
In cricket, two batsmen are always present at the crease batting together in a partnership. This partnership will continue until one of them is dismissed, retires or the innings comes to a close.

Highest partnerships by wicket
A wicket partnership describes the number of runs scored before each wicket falls. The first wicket partnership is between the opening batsmen and continues until the first wicket falls. The second wicket partnership then commences between the not out batsman and the number three batsman. This partnership continues until the second wicket falls. The third wicket partnership then commences between the not out batsman and the new batsman. This continues down to the tenth wicket partnership. When the tenth wicket has fallen, there is no batsman left to partner so the innings is closed.

Highest partnerships by runs
The highest Test partnership by runs for any wicket is held by the Sri Lankan pairing of Kumar Sangakkara and Mahela Jayawardene who put together a third wicket partnership of 624 runs during the first Test against South Africa in July 2006. This broke the record of 576 runs set by their compatriots Sanath Jayasuriya and Roshan Mahanama against India in 1997. New Zealand's Andrew Jones and Martin Crowe hold the third highest Test partnership with 467 made in 1991 against Sri Lanka.

Highest overall partnership runs by a pair

Umpiring records

Most matches umpired
An umpire in cricket is a person who officiates the match according to the Laws of Cricket. Two umpires adjudicate the match on the field, whilst a third umpire has access to video replays, and a fourth umpire looks after the match balls and other duties. The records below are only for on-field umpires.

Aleem Dar of Pakistan holds the record for the most Test matches umpired with 130. The current active Dar set the record in December 2019 overtaking Steve Bucknor from the West Indies mark of 128 matches. They are followed by South Africa's Rudi Koertzen who officiated in 108.

See also
Cricket statistics
List of New Zealand One Day International cricket records
List of New Zealand Twenty20 International cricket records
List of Test cricket records
Portal:Cricket

Notes

References

Test cricket records
Test records